The list of ship launches in 1981 includes a chronological list of all ships launched in 1981.



References

Sources
 

1981
1981 in transport